This is a list of survivors of the Sobibor extermination camp. The list is divided into two groups. The first comprises the 58 known survivors of those selected to perform forced labour for the camp's daily operation. The second comprises those deported to Sobibor but selected there for forced labor in other camps.

Survivors among Sobibor's forced labourers
This list is as complete as current records allow. There were 58 known Sobibor survivors: 48 male and 10 female.

The vast majority of the people taken to Sobibor did not survive but were shot or gassed immediately upon arrival.

Survivors among those selected at Sobibor for forced labour in other camps

Selections sometimes took place at the point of departure, often well before people were forced to board the trains, but there are also reports of selections from trains already en route to the camps. In his June 20, 1942 report, Revier-Leutnant der Schutzpolizei Josef Frischmann, in charge of the guard unit on the train, wrote that "51 Jews capable of work" were removed from the transport at Lublin station. The train had departed Vienna on June 14, 1942, ostensibly for Izbica, but the remaining 949 people on board were delivered to their final destination in Sobibor.

The precise number of those spared upon arrival in the Sobibor extermination camp is unknown, but there were occasional selections there, for forced labour in other camps and factories, amounting to a total of several thousand people. Many of those selected subsequently perished due to harsh conditions in the slave-labour details. A number of them were murdered after internal selections, following transfers to Majdanek and Auschwitz, where people were also routinely murdered by hanging or shooting for arbitrary offences. Thousands of Jews initially selected for slave-labour were among those killed in the Lublin district during , and many were shot or succumbed on the death marches in the closing stages of the Nazi regime. However, some of the people selected at Sobibor ultimately survived beyond the total defeat and unconditional surrender of the Nazis in May 1945.

On August 17, 1943, a survivor from Sabinov in Slovakia, who has remained anonymous, wrote a report in which he described his selection in Sobibor, together with approximately 100 men and 50 women, upon arrival. For slave-labour in the drainage works in the vicinity of Sobibor they were taken to Krychów. He had arrived following the violent clearance of deported Slovakian Jews and the few remaining Polish Jews from the Rejowiec ghetto on August 9, 1942. He described how a few additional skilled workers, technicians, blacksmiths and watchmakers were separated upon arrival in Sobibor. He further wrote that fire was visible in the night sky in the vicinity of Sobibor, and that the stench of burning hair permeated the air.

Approximately 1,000 people were selected from the 34,313 named deportees who had been deported from the Netherlands via Westerbork to Sobibor between March 2 and July 20, 1943. Only 16 of them, 13 women and three men, survived.
From the group of approximately 30 women selected from the train which left Westerbork with 1,015 people on March 10, 1943, 13 survived the various camps. Although they were split up after arrival in Lublin and returned to the Netherlands via different camps and routes, this was the largest single group of survivors from any one of the 19 trains which departed the Netherlands.
Upon arrival they were separated from the other deportees and shortly afterwards taken by train to Lublin, where they spent the next months in various work details divided over Majdanek and the Alter Flugplatz camp, on the site of an airfield. Here, their first assignment was assisting in body disposal and sorting the looted possessions of those murdered at the Trawniki camp. After body disposal had nearly been completed, the remaining men were also murdered.
Elias Isak Alex Cohen was the only survivor of the March 17, 1943 transport. He was taken to Majdanek with a group of approximately 35 people selected based on profession. His experiences include a period operating machinery in the ammunition factory in Skarżysko-Kamienna, where the poisonous materials and lack of protections decimated the forced-labourers. 
Jozef Wins was the only one to return to the Netherlands from the May 11 transport. He was among a group of 80 men taken to Dorohucza. Jules Schelvis was the sole survivor of the 3,006 people on the deportation train of June 1, 1943, He too was taken to Dorohucza, with a group of 80 other men. From the remaining 14 trains, people were also selected but no one survived the Holocaust.

See also 

 List of victims of Sobibor

Notes

References 

Sobibor
Survivors
 
Sobibor survivors